Sergio Navarro may refer to:

Sergio Navarro (footballer, born 1936), Chilean former footballer
Sergio Navarro (footballer, born 1979), Spanish football manager

Navarro, Sergio